Several vessels have been named Woolton for Woolton, or Woolton Hall:

 Woolton (1774 ship), was launched at King's Lynn in 1773 as Narr. By 1775 she was sailing between London and Liverpool as Woolton. A French privateer captured and ransomed her in September 1779. In 1781 she sailed briefly as a privateer and made one notable capture that involved a single ship action. After the war Woolton continued to trade primarily between London and Liverpool until she was wrecked in 1785.
 Woolton (1786 ship) was launched in 1786 at Liverpool. She spent her brief career sailing between Liverpool and London until she was wrecked in 1791 at the outset of a voyage to Virginia.
 Woolton (1804 ship) was a French vessel launched in the East Indies in 1788 under another name and taken in prize in 1803. In 1804 Woolton became a Liverpool-based slave ship in the triangular trade in enslaved people. She made one complete slave voyage and was wrecked as she was almost home from her second slave voyage.
 , a snow, later a schooner, of 284 tons (bm), was built by James Hardie and launched at Southwick, Sunderland in 1863. She was wrecked near Den Helder, Netherlands on 8 March 1907 with loss of all the crew.
On 14 June 1893 she sailed from Newcastle, New South Wales, for Valparaiso, Chile, with a cargo of coal and tallow and disappeared during the voyage.

References

Ship names